Asterolepis cypta is a species of moth of the family Tortricidae. It is found in Brunei. The habitat consists of dipterocarp forests.

The wingspan is 13–14 mm. The ground colour of the forewings is pearl cream with silver dots. The markings are yellowish cream with a weak brownish hue. The hindwings are white cream. Adults are on wing in April and September.

Etymology
The species name refers to the curved aedeagus and is derived from Greek kypto (meaning I am bending).

References

Moths described in 2012
Tortricini
Moths of Asia